Vyner is a surname and may refer to:

 Margaret Vyner (1914–1993), Australian film actress
 Michael Vyner (1943–1989), English arts administrator
 Reginald Vyner (1839–1870), British Liberal Party politician
 Sir Robert Vyner, 1st Baronet (1631–1688), Lord Mayor of London 1674
 Robert Vyner (1686–1777), Member of Parliament (MP) for Great Grimsby  1710–1713, and for Lincolnshire 1724–1761
 Robert Vyner (1717–1799), MP for Okehampton 1754–1761, for Lincoln 1774–1784    
 Robert Vyner (1762-1810), MP for Lincolnshire 1794–1802
 Sir Thomas Vyner, 1st Baronet (1588–1665),  Lord Mayor of London in 1653
 Thomas Vyner (MP) (1666–1707), MP for Great Grimsby 1699–1701
 Thomas Vyner (priest) (died 1673), Canon of Windsor and Dean of Gloucester Cathedral
 Zak Vyner (born 1997), English footballer

See also
 Viner, another surname